In Ohio, State Route 680 may refer to:
Interstate 680 in Ohio, the only Ohio highway numbered 680 since about 1962
Ohio State Route 680 (1930s-1960s), now SR 681